Nikom Somwang (born August 18, 1983), simply known as Aung. He is a professional footballer from Roi Et Province, Thailand.

Honours

Ubon UMT United

Regional League Division 2
 Winner  : 2015
Regional League North-East Division
 Runner-up  : 2015

References

Super Sub Thailand: 
Football in Thailand
https://us.soccerway.com/players/nikom-somwang/474179/

1983 births
Living people
Nikom Somwang
Nikom Somwang
Association football central defenders
Nikom Somwang
Nikom Somwang
Nikom Somwang
Nikom Somwang
Nikom Somwang